Irbis Shekui Khagan (full title: Yǐpíshèkuìkĕhàn 乙毗射匮可汗) (r. 642–651) was the penultimate ruler of the Western Turkic Khaganate.
He was linked to the Nushibi faction and was son of El Kulug Shad.

Reign 
In 642, he overthrew Yukuk Shad (r. 638–642) with support from the expanding Tang dynasty Chinese. Although Yukuk Shad was still active and controlling a part of the territory, Irbis Shekui had the support of Nushibi (western) tribes. During the early years of his reign the rivalry between the Nushibi and Dulu factions cooled off.

In 646, he sought a Chinese princess for his bride. In return, Emperor Taizong of Tang demanded the return of several Tarim Basin cities. When this was refused the Chinese invaded the Tarim. Two years later several Dulu leaders took refuge in China. With them the khaganate also lost Dzungaria to China. 

Later in his reign, Ashina Helu rebelled against him in 646, but was defeated. In 651 he was overthrown by Ashina Helu who was supported by the Dulu faction and Tang China now.

See also
Irbis (Khazar)

References

7th-century Turkic people
Ashina house of the Turkic Empire
Göktürk khagans
Year of birth unknown
Year of death missing